Tinospora cordifolia (common names gurjo, heart-leaved moonseed, guduchi or giloy) is a herbaceous vine of the family Menispermaceae indigenous to tropical regions of the Indian subcontinent. It has been used in Ayurveda to treat various disorders, but in spite of clinical investigation, the effectiveness of such treatments remain uncertain.

Botanical description

It is a large, deciduous, extensively-spreading, climbing vine with several elongated twining branches. It gets its name heart-leaved moonseed by its heart-shaped leaves and its reddish fruit. Flowers are unisexual, small on separate plants and appearing when the plant is leafless, greenish-yellow on axillary and terminal racemes. Male flowers are clustered, but female flowers are usually solitary. It has six sepals in two series of three each. The outer ones are smaller than the inner. It has six petals which are smaller than sepals, obovate, and membranous. Fruits aggregate in clusters of one to three. They are ovoid smooth drupelets on thick stalks with sub terminal style scars, scarlet or orange colored.

Ecology 
Endophytic fungi colonize the living, internal tissues of their host without causing any harmful effects. A recent study has shown that 29 endophytes belonging to different taxa were present in the samples collected from T. cordifolia.

Extracts of the endophytic fungus Nigrospora sphaerica obtained from T. cordifolia were found to have insecticidal properties against the Oriental leafworm moth (Spodoptera litura), a polyphagous pest.

Phytochemicals 
Tinospora cordifolia contains diverse phytochemicals, including alkaloids, phytosterols, glycosides, tinosporide, and other mixed chemical compounds.

Traditional medicine
Although used in Ayurveda over centuries in the belief that Tinospora has medicinal properties, there is no good evidence that it is effective for treating any disease. 

During the 2020-22 COVID-19 outbreak in India, the Ministry of AYUSH recommended use of T. cordifolia ("giloy") as a home remedy for immune support, but such a practice appeared to be associated with hepatitis cases among six people in Mumbai who used boiled or capsule preparations of the plant.

References

Menispermaceae
Flora of Asia
Medicinal plants
Plants used in Ayurveda
Taxa named by Carl Peter Thunberg